Hollywood is a village in west County Wicklow, Ireland. It is situated on the Wicklow Gap road, near its junction with the N81 national secondary road. It is known for its pre-1950s themed fair which takes place in August of every year. A population of less than 100 people registered in the 2002 Census, though the community draws from a larger area which consists of about 500 people.

Etymology 
Cillín Chaoimhín is the associated Irish name for Hollywood; its literal translation being Kevin's Small Church. Another, older Irish name is Cnoic Rua, literally meaning Red Hill. This may be a reference to the red berries of holly trees on the hills above the village or it may in fact be a reference to the presence of Wicklow heather. Another possibility is that the original name for Hollywood may have been Holy Wood, as a reference to Saint Kevin's passage through.

Pilgrimage 

The village has an association with 6th Century Saint Kevin and many pilgrims passed through, following in Saint Kevin's footsteps, on their way to the monastic settlement at Glendalough, until the practice ceased in the early 1900s. Local landmarks include Saint Kevin's Chair, and Saint Kevin's Cave. Saint Kevin's Way is a 30 km pilgrim path from Hollywood to Glendalough, and is connected to the Wicklow Mountains National Park.

Surroundings 

The Church of Ireland in the village church has a vaulted roof from the 17th century. About 3 km northeast of the village is Poulaphouca, where the Liffey cascades in three stages.

The Bronze Age Piper's Stones, are 3.5 km to the southwest of Hollywood on the N81. The site is signposted.

Hollywood, like its namesake in California, has a connection to the entertainment industry. It has provided a setting for several films, including King Arthur Dancing At Lughnasa, and Michael Collins. An imitation of the iconic Hollywood Sign overlooks the village from a nearby hill. It also gave its name to an album by The Voice Squad which was recorded in St Kevin's Church.

References

External links
CSO 2006 census
Hollywood GAA website
Hollywood at Discover Ireland
Genealogy death records for headstones in the Saint Kevin's Church cemetery

Towns and villages in County Wicklow